John Birkinshaw (1777-1842) was a 19th-century railway engineer from Bedlington, Northumberland noted for his invention of wrought iron rails in 1820 (patented on October 23, 1820). 

Up to this point, rail systems had used either wooden rails, which were totally incapable of supporting steam engines, or cast iron rails typically only 3 feet in length. These cast iron rails, developed by William Jessop and others, only allowed very low speeds and broke easily and although steam locomotives had been tested as early as 1804 by Richard Trevithick, these experiments had not been economically successful as the rails frequently broke.

"John Birkinshaw's 1820 patent for rolling wrought-iron rails in 15ft lengths was a vital breakthrough for the infant railway system. Wrought iron was able to withstand the moving load of a locomotive and train unlike cast iron, used for rails until then, which was brittle and fractured all too easily." 

Birkinshaw's wrought iron rails were taken up by George Stephenson in 1821 for the proposed Stockton and Darlington Railway, despite the fact that Stephenson already held the rights to the best cast iron product, and it was this railway that effectively launched the rail era.

Career
 In 1821, whilst an engineer at Bedlington Ironworks, Birkinshaw developed a new method of rolling wrought iron rails in fifteen feet lengths.
 His son John Cass Birkinshaw (1811–1867) worked for Robert Stephenson as an Assistant engineer  on the London & Birmingham Railway (L&BR), then Resident  Engineer  on the Birmingham and Derby Junction Railway, and was Engineer-in-Chief  for the Malton & Driffield Railway (MDR).

(Cross-Rudkin et al., 2008, pp. 94–95) Cross-Rudkin, P. S. M., Chrimes, M. M., Bailey, M. R., Cox, R. C., Hurst, B. L., C., M. R., . . . Swailes, T. (2008). Biographical Dictionary of Civil Engineers in Great Britain and Ireland, Volume 2: 1830-1890 (Vol. Second). London E14 4JD: Thomas Telford.

Private life
Birkinshaw married at St John's, Newcastle upon Tyne on 10 October 1809. He and his wife Ann Cas had eight children:
John Cass Birkinshaw (1811-1867)
Henry Birkinshaw (b. 1817)
George Peter Birkenshaw (b. 1820)
William Birkinshaw (b. 1822)
Emma A. (b. 1824)
Edward Birkinshaw (b. 1826)
Richard (b. 1829)
Mary (b. 1834)

See also
Permanent way (history)
Rail transport

References 

British railway civil engineers
People of the Industrial Revolution
English civil engineers
English inventors
Year of death unknown
Year of birth unknown
People from Bedlington
1777 births
1842 deaths